Patricia "Pat" Mainardi (born November 10, 1942) is a leading authority on nineteenth-century European art and European and American modernism, and a pioneering professor of women's studies.

Career and activism
Pat Mainardi was part of the radical feminist group Redstockings. In 1970, she contributed the essay, "The Politics of Housework," to the anthology Sisterhood is Powerful. (See it below under “External links”.) It had originally been published by Redstockings earlier that year. In 1977, Mainardi became an associate of the Women's Institute for Freedom of the Press (WIFP). WIFP is an American nonprofit publishing organization. The organization works to increase communication between women and connect the public with forms of women-based media.

She is the Executive Officer (chair) of the doctoral program in art history at the Graduate Center, The City University of New York. She was awarded the Chevalier dans l'Ordre des Palmes Academiques in France. She has received fellowships from the National Endowment for the Humanities, the American Council of Learned Societies, the Center for Advanced Study in the Visual Arts at the National Gallery of Art, and the Institute for Advanced Study.

Mainardi has also taught at Harvard University, Princeton University and Williams College. In the early 1990s, Mainardi was the first president of the Association of Historians of Nineteenth-Century Art (AHNCA).

She is an editorial board member for the journal Nineteenth-Century Art Worldwide and a past member of the Council of Field Editors for the journal caa.reviews.

Her image is included in the iconic 1972 poster  Some Living American Women Artists by Mary Beth Edelson.

Awards
Mainardi received the 1989 Charles Rufus Morey Book Award from the College Art Association for her book  Art and Politics of the Second Empire: The Universal Expositions of 1855 and 1867. In 2016, the French government awarded her a knighthood, as a Chevalier dans l’Ordre des Palmes Académiques, citing both her academic scholarship and her feminist activism.

References

External links
PATRICIA MAINARDI Faculty profile at the CUNY Graduate Center
The Politics of Housework

Living people
1942 births
Women art historians
Graduate Center, CUNY faculty
Harvard University faculty
Chevaliers of the Ordre des Palmes Académiques
Redstockings members